was an officer and ace fighter pilot in the Imperial Japanese Navy (IJN) during the Second Sino-Japanese War and the Pacific theater of World War II. In aerial combat over China, the Pacific, and Japan, he was officially credited with destroying twelve enemy aircraft. Isozaki survived World War II.

References

1913 births
Year of death missing
Japanese naval aviators
Japanese World War II flying aces
Military personnel from Aichi Prefecture
Imperial Japanese Navy officers